The Coin of the Year Award (COTY) is an awards program founded and annually conducted by the American publisher Krause Publications of Iola, Wisconsin, and directed at the coin producing industry. Awards are given for numismatic design, artistic vision and craftsmanship. A panel of international judges chooses the coins from those issued two years prior to the year of the award.

About
The COTY was awarded for the first time in 1984, in which coins issued in 1982 were assessed.  A panel of judges chooses ten coins to be nominees for each of ten categories.  These nominees will then be reviewed by an international panel of judges who are numismatic experts, journalist, authors, coin designers, and mint, bank and museum officials.  Category winners are selected in the first round of voting and Coin of the Year in the second round, chosen from the category winners.

Categories
Awards are currently given in ten categories.  When the awards were first started, there were six categories. Five categories have since been added with one dropped.

Best Bi-Metallic: (1995–present)  Bi-metallic coins are composed of two metals which can be seen, generally one metal in an outer ring and one in the inner ring.
Best Contemporary Event: (1996–present) Coins which commemorate events, institutions physical entities, or individuals which are deemed to be most important in terms of current or recent events influencing a people or mankind. 
Best Crown: Coins which have all-around aesthetic and commercial appeal, and have a minimum diameter of 33mm.
Best Circulating: (1987–present) Circulating monetary unit coins which are made of non-precious metals, possess all-around aesthetic and commercial appeal.
Best Gold: Coins fabricated of gold, platinum, Palladium, or another exotic precious metal which have all-around aesthetic and commercial appeal.
Best Silver: Coins fabricated of silver which have all-around aesthetic and commercial appeal.
Most Popular: (1986-2013) Coins with commercial sales and artistic caliber which appeals to the general public internationally.
Most Artistic: Coins selected solely on the value of their artistic merit.
Most Historically Significant: Coins which commemorate events, institutions, physical entities, or individual which are deemed to be most important in terms of the historical heritage of a people or mankind.
Most Innovative: (1990–present) Coins which contain pioneering metallic alloys, non-typical coinage materials, planchet shapes, thickness, sizes, themes, distribution methods or other innovations.
Most Inspirational: (1995–present) Coins featuring themes, events, institutions, physical entities, or individuals that represent peace, freedom, and human rights.

List of award winners

2022 (minted in 2020) 

Reference and images:

2021 (minted in 2019) 

Reference and images:

2020 (minted in 2018) 

Reference and images:

2019 (minted in 2017) 

Reference and images:

2018 (minted in 2016) 

Reference and images:

2017 (minted in 2015) 

Reference and images:

2016 (minted in 2014) 

Reference and images:

2015 (minted in 2013) 

Reference and images:

2014 (minted in 2012) 

Reference and images:

2013 (minted in 2011) 

Reference and images:

2012 (minted in 2010) 

Reference and images:

2011 (minted in 2009)

2010 (minted in 2008)

2009 (minted in 2007)

2008 (minted in 2006)

2007 (minted in 2005)

2006 (minted in 2004)

2005  (minted in 2003)

2004  (minted in 2002)

2003  (minted in 2001)

2002  (minted in 2000)

2001  (minted in 1999)

2000  (minted in 1998)

1999  (minted in 1997)

1998  (minted in 1996)

1997  (minted in 1995)

1996  (minted in 1994)

1995  (minted in 1993)

1994  (minted in 1992)

1993  (minted in 1991)

1992  (minted in 1990)

1991  (minted in 1989)

1990  (minted in 1988)

1989  (minted in 1987)

1988  (minted in 1986)

1987  (minted in 1985)

1986  (minted in 1984)

1985 (minted in 1983)

1984  (minted in 1982)

References 
General
 
 

Specific

Coins
American awards
Design awards
Awards established in 1984
Lists of awards
Awards for numismatics